Haveke (also known as Aveke or 'Aveke) is a Kanak language of New Caledonia, in the commune of Voh. Bwatoo dialect is distinct.

The language is considered endangered with 300 native speakers worldwide reported in 1982. That number gets lower due to the expansion of French in New Caledonia. There are virtually no children speakers of Havake.

References

Further reading 

 Rivierre, Jean-Claude; Ehrhart, Sabine; Diela, Raymond (2006). Le bwatoo et les dialectes de la région de Koné (Nouvelle-Calédonie) (in French) – via Google Books.

New Caledonian languages
Languages of New Caledonia
Definitely endangered languages